Carya cathayensis (common name Chinese hickory) is a species of hickory native to China. Peeled and roasted nuts, known as 山核桃仁, are a well-known specialty of Hangzhou.

References 

cathayensis
Hangzhou cuisine